Nicolas Lapierre (born 2 April 1984) is a French professional racing driver. He raced with Toyota and with Alpine Racing in the past seasons of the FIA World Endurance Championship. He is a two-time winner of the 12 Hours of Sebring, with overall victories in 2011 and 2018, and scored four LMP2 class victories in the 24 Hours of Le Mans in 2015, 2016, 2018, and 2019. He now races with Alpine in the LMH class in the FIA World Endurance Championship driving the number 36 Alpine A480.

Career history

Early career
Born in Thonon-les-Bains, Lapierre started his career in 1993 in karting, finishing 3rd in the French championship in 1996, 6th in the European Championships in 1997 and reaching the finals of the European Junior Championship in 1998 before moving to French Formula Renault in 1999. He stayed there for 2000 and 2001, 2001 also seeing two races in Formula Renault 2000 Eurocup. He again raced in French Formula Renault in 2002, also driving a full season of 2000 Eurocup and some races of French Formula Three (most of them being in the main class, although he drove two races in the B-Class also).

2003 saw Lapierre move to Formula Three Euroseries with the Signature team and earn a win in the Macau Grand Prix. He stayed in the Euroseries for 2004, also driving two races of British Formula 3.

With his reputation increasing and his talent proven, Lapierre was rewarded for his Euroseries performances with a drive in GP2 Series for current champions Arden Motorsport. He partnered with Heikki Kovalainen.

GP2 & A1GP
During 2005 Lapierre drove for A1 Team France in the A1 Grand Prix series helping the team win the championship and therefore the World Cup of Motorsport. Lapierre won both the sprint and main race events in Germany and Australia, the main race in Dubai and the sprint in Indonesia.

During 2006 he continued with the Arden team in GP2, however his season was interrupted by a spectacular first corner crash in Monaco in which he was a victim of someone else's accident. Lapierre received two compressed vertebrae in the crash and missed the British round of the series. Despite this, his points score was higher than the previous season's tally.

Lapierre was dropped at the end of 2006 and has since signed to participate in a 3rd season of GP2 for the DAMS team, which finished 10th overall in the constructors' standings and runs the French A1 GP team, which won the first season of A1 Grand Prix.

Touring Cars

Lapierre was announced as a LADA driver for the remainder of the 2015 World Touring Car Championship in August 2015, replacing Jaap van Lagen at the Russian team.

Racing record

Career summary

† Guest Driver ineligible for points
‡ Teams Standings

Complete Formula 3 Euro Series results
(key) (Races in bold indicate pole position) (Races in italics indicate fastest lap)

Complete A1 Grand Prix results
(key) (Races in bold indicate pole position) (Races in italics indicate fastest lap)

Complete GP2 Series results
(key) (Races in bold indicate pole position) (Races in italics indicate fastest lap)

Complete 24 Hours of Le Mans results

Complete FIA World Endurance Championship results

Complete World Touring Car Championship results
(key) (Races in bold indicate pole position) (Races in italics indicate fastest lap)

Complete European Le Mans Series results

‡ Half points awarded as less than 75% of race distance was completed.

Complete IMSA SportsCar Championship results
(key) (Races in bold indicate pole position; races in italics indicate fastest lap)

† Points only counted towards the Michelin Endurance Cup, and not the overall LMP2 Championship.
* Season still in progress.

References

External links

 Nicolas Lapierre official website
 Career statistic driverdb.com
 A1GP Driver Statistics results.a1gp.com

1984 births
Living people
GP2 Series drivers
A1 Team France drivers
French Formula Renault 2.0 drivers
Formula Renault Eurocup drivers
French Formula Three Championship drivers
British Formula Three Championship drivers
Formula 3 Euro Series drivers
French racing drivers
24 Hours of Le Mans drivers
American Le Mans Series drivers
European Le Mans Series drivers
FIA World Endurance Championship drivers
Blancpain Endurance Series drivers
24 Hours of Spa drivers
Asian Le Mans Series drivers
WeatherTech SportsCar Championship drivers
24 Hours of Daytona drivers
12 Hours of Sebring drivers
Tech 1 Racing drivers
Graff Racing drivers
Signature Team drivers
Arden International drivers
DAMS drivers
Oreca drivers
Toyota Gazoo Racing drivers
KCMG drivers
People from Thonon-les-Bains
Sportspeople from Haute-Savoie
A1 Grand Prix drivers
World Touring Car Championship drivers
DragonSpeed drivers
Extreme Speed Motorsports drivers
TDS Racing drivers
ART Grand Prix drivers
ISR Racing drivers
Starworks Motorsport drivers